BHN may refer to:

 Bahrain, sovereign state in the Persian Gulf
 Bright House Networks, former American telecom company
 Brinell scale, a definition of hardness in materials science
 the IATA airport code for Beihan Airport, Yemen
 the ISO 639-3 language code for Bohtan Neo-Aramaic